You is the first album released by the pop/electro band Bang Gang. It was written by Barði Jóhannson and released in 1998.

Track listing
All songs by Barði Jóhannson except "In Heaven".
"Sacred Things"
"Hazing Out"
"So Alone"
"Liar"
"Sleep"
"Falling Apart"
"Save Me"
"Never Ever"
"Another You"
"Hard Life, Simple Song"
"In Heaven"

Musicians
 Barði Jóhannson - guitar, vocals
 Esther Talia Casey - vocals

1998 albums
Bang Gang albums